M. A. Hanna Company was an iron ore processing company located in Cleveland, Ohio, United States.

Origin
The origins of the M. A. Hanna Co. are with Daniel F. Rhodes. In the 1840s Rhodes had founded  Rhodes & Company which mined coal in the Mahoning Valley. Mark Hanna, the national Republican political figure, then married into the Rhodes family setting the stage for a change. It became Hanna Mining in 1885. In the mid-1860s the company expanded into iron ore mining in the area around Lake Superior.

Incorporation took place in 1922 and was named as the M.A. Hanna Company. In 1929 the Hanna Company transferred its blast furnaces, coke ovens, and other materials to National Steel Corporation for stock in NSC. Hanna's bituminous coal properties were put into the newly formed Consolidation Coal Company in 1945 in return for CCC stock.

1950s
In the early 1950s the company began diversification under George Humphrey producing high-grade iron ore pellets and establishing Iron Ore Company of Canada. Hanna also acquired interests in mineral companies in Latin America as well as beginning the mining of nickel in Oregon and silicon in Washington.

In 1958 Hanna's subsidiary, the Hanna Coal & Ore Company, became the independent Hanna Mining Company while M. A. Hanna continued with mineral sales and in its investment firm work until  liquidation in 1965.

1970s
By the early 1970s, Hanna Mining was the world's second-largest producer of iron ore with United States Steel being the largest. Also during this decade, Hanna  secured interests in petroleum, low sulfur coal, and mineral exploration. Hanna executives  believed that the name Hanna Mining did not reflect the entire scope of what the company embodied and the name returned to M. A. Hanna Company in March 1985.

On October 6, 1978, Hanna Mining Company sold the Escanaba & Lake Superior Railroad to John C. Larkin, a businessman from Minneapolis who had organized a passenger excursion on the railroad earlier in the decade.

During the 1980s under CEO Martin D. Walker, M. A. Hanna began acquiring plastic and polymer companies while divesting itself of mining and energy property. Hanna purchased Burton Rubber Processing Company in 1986 and other polymer industries totaling sales of $1.1 billion in 1990. By 1993, M. A. Hanna's revenue from polymer processing was 99% of all revenue. By 1998, annual sales reached $2.3 billion annually. Hanna merged with polyvinyl chloride giant Geon Company, a former division of the B. F. Goodrich Company that became a separate entity in 1993. The merger produced PolyOne Corporation, a company worth $3.5 billion and ranked in the Fortune 1000.

References

F.S. Smithers & Co. The Iron Ore Industry and the Cleveland-Cliffs Iron Co., the Hanna Mining Co., the M. A. Hanna Co. (1960).

External links
PolyOne Corporation

Companies based in Cleveland
Defunct mining companies of the United States